This is a list of active Croatian Navy ships. As of 2013, the Croatian Navy operates over 30 vessels including five missile boats which, along with three MOL coastal defence batteries, represent its main offensive capability.

Due to constant reductions of the defence budget and the ongoing financial crisis, acquisition of new ships has proven to be problematic. The latest ships to enter service with the Croatian Navy were two used Helsinki-class missile boats,  which were acquired as an offset agreement to the Croatian purchase of Patria AMV vehicles.

Domestic production programs were limited to continuing existing Yugoslav designs and building a single missile boat and a small mine hunter (Korčula), both of which took several years to complete.

Plans to start production of domestic patrol vessels (much needed for guarding the 6000 km long coastline) have been reduced and postponed over time  with newest plans to start a prototype in 2015. The tender was in May 2014 and as projected, the first vessel will enter service in 2015. The second one will follow in 2016, the third and the fourth in 2017 and the last one in 2018. The units are projected to cost around 10 million euros each.

Missile boats

Patrol boats

Training vessel

Rescue vessel

Minehunter

Landing craft and mine layers

Auxiliary cargo vessels

Yachts

Launch

Harbour tugboats

Sailboats

See also 

List of ships of the Yugoslav Navy

References 

Navy ships
Ships of the Croatian Navy
Croatia
Lists of currently active military vehicles